The Tottenville station is a Staten Island Railway rapid transit station in the neighborhood of Tottenville, Staten Island, New York. Located near Main Street and Arthur Kill Road, it is the southern terminus on the main line and the southernmost railway station in both New York City and New York State.

History
The station opened on June 2, 1860, with the opening of the Staten Island Railway from Annadale to Tottenville. Eight shipyards were located at this location in the 1880s. From the year 1860 to 1885, the locomotives of the Staten Island Railway were maintained and repaired at Journea's Shipyard and at Tyrell's Machine shop. A ferry was operated by the Staten Island Railway from 1867 until 1948 that ran across the Arthur Kill to the Perth Amboy Ferry Slip in Perth Amboy, New Jersey. The ferry service dated back to the 1700s and ended on October 17, 1963. There are remains of the old slip to the ferry near the end of Bentley Street, which is now a dead-end street blocked by a Jersey barrier.

The station was destroyed on September 3, 1929 after a fire burned the station down. The fire was attributed to the third rail short circuiting. The two -long platforms were destroyed as were five train cars being stored near the station. The damage was estimated to cost $200,000. Passengers using the Perth Amboy Ferry were forced to use the nearby Atlantic station instead.

Derailments
On December 26, 2008 at 6:27 a.m., an empty train was pulling into this station to accept passengers for its a.m. rush hour run to St. George when it ran into the bumper block and subsequently derailed. An investigation revealed that the engineer, Kim Canady, fell asleep at the helm, having stayed up late the night before to celebrate Christmas with her family.

On May 29, 2014 at 6:36 a.m., another empty train hit the same bumper block in the station, and the train's engineer and conductor were injured.

Station layout
This is a grade-level station with two tracks and an island platform. There are three tracks to the east of the platform for storing trains. All five tracks end at bumper blocks at their south ends. The station color is orange.

During rush hours, this station is served only by express trains from St. George. Local trains from St. George terminate at Great Kills.

Exits

The south end is ADA-accessible via a ramp to Bentley Street and a tiny parking area. The 1930s head house is used by SIRTOA employees only. The roadway leads to the end of Arthur Kill Road. The north end is accessible via passageway and overpass, south to Main Street, and north to Ellis Street.

References

External links

 Staten Island Railway station list
 Staten Island Railway general information
 Bentley Street entrance from Google Maps Street View
 Main Street entrance from Google Maps Street View
 Platform from Google Maps Street View

Staten Island Railway stations
Railway stations in the United States opened in 1860
1860 establishments in New York (state)
Tottenville, Staten Island